Madison Lake is a small city in Blue Earth County, Minnesota, United States. The population was 1,247 at the 2020 census. It is part of the Mankato-North Mankato Metropolitan Statistical Area.

History
The area that is now Madison Lake was originally called Barclay's addition. In 1881, this land was deeded to L.S. Barclay for the town and was shortly thereafter named Madison Lake. A post office called Madison Lake has been in operation since 1885. The town took its name from nearby Madison Lake, which was named for President James Madison. The Village was incorporated in 1892.

The Wisconsin, Minnesota and Pacific Railroad built westward from Red Wing, Minnesota, reaching Madison Lake by 1884 at a distance 78.4 miles. Mankato, a further 20 miles westward, was reached by 1887. The railroad line became part of the Chicago Great Western Railroad. This is now the route of the Cannon Valley Trail.

On Friday, December 23, 1910, four blocks of downtown Madison Lake were devastated by fire. The loss was estimated at $100,000 at the time.

Geography

Minnesota State Highway 60 serves as a main route in the community.  U.S. Route 14 is nearby.

Demographics
According to the most recent American Community Survey, the racial composition of Madison Lake was:

 White: 94.57%
 Two or more races: 2.77%
 Black or African American: 2.25%
 Asian: 0.41%
 Native American: 0.00%
 Native Hawaiian or Pacific Islander: 0.00%
 Other race: 0.00%

2010 census
As of the census of 2010, there were 1,017 people, 394 households, and 271 families living in the city. The racial makeup of the city was 96.7% White, 0.5% African American, 0.6% Native American, 0.5% Asian, 0.1% Pacific Islander, 1.1% from other races, and 0.6% from two or more races. Hispanic or Latino of any race were 2.0% of the population.

There were 394 households, of which 37.8% had children under the age of 18 living with them, 51.0% were married couples living together, 11.4% had a female householder with no husband present, 6.3% had a male householder with no wife present, and 31.2% were non-families. 22.8% of all households were made up of individuals, and 7.3% had someone living alone who was 65 years of age or older. The average household size was 2.58 and the average family size was 3.01.

The median age in the city was 33.3 years. 26.2% of residents were under the age of 18; 8.2% were between the ages of 18 and 24; 32.7% were from 25 to 44; 24.4% were from 45 to 64; and 8.5% were 65 years of age or older. The gender makeup of the city was 50.0% male and 50.0% female.

2000 census
As of the census of 2000, there were 837 people, 319 households, and 223 families living in the city. A 2007 estimate shows the population has grown to 990. The racial makeup of the city was 98.21% White, 0.60% African American, 0.48% Native American, 0.36% Asian, and 0.36% from two or more races. Hispanic or Latino of any race were 2.27% of the population.

There were 319 households, out of which 38.9% had children under the age of 18 living with them, 55.5% were married couples living together, 10.0% had a female householder with no husband present, and 29.8% were non-families. 21.3% of all households were made up of individuals, and 9.4% had someone living alone who was 65 years of age or older.  The average household size was 2.62 and the average family size was 3.09.

In the city, the population was spread out, with 29.5% under the age of 18, 7.8% from 18 to 24, 34.5% from 25 to 44, 19.1% from 45 to 64, and 9.1% who were 65 years of age or older.  The median age was 32 years. For every 100 females, there were 100.7 males.  For every 100 females age 18 and over, there were 98.7 males.

The median income for a household in the city was $84,659, and the median income for a family was $97,673. Males had a median income of $65,000 versus $44,938 for females. The per capita income for the city was $38,312.  About 2.6% of families and 4.0% of the population were below the poverty line, including 3.7% of those under age 18 and 7.3% of those age 65 or over.

Politics

Election Results

Madison Lake Watershed and Lake Association
The Madison Lake Watershed and Lake Association is a non-profit organization established for the purpose of protecting and preserving the natural resource of Madison Lake for future generations. MLWLA promotes the protection and improvement of the lake and surrounding watershed area through education and advocacy. Its goals include improving the water quality of the lake through an assessment of the lake's needs to determine the best approach to achieving a healthy, thriving lake and watershed ecosystem.

References

External links

Madison Lake, MN -- Official site

Madison Lake Watershed & Lake Association

Cities in Blue Earth County, Minnesota
Cities in Minnesota
Mankato – North Mankato metropolitan area
1885 establishments in Minnesota